Alfred Luff (5 April 1846 – 24 February 1933) was an English cricketer. Luff was a right-handed batsman who bowled right-arm roundarm fast. He was born at Kew, Surrey.

His second appearance came against the Marylebone Cricket Club at The Oval, while his third appearance came against Yorkshire at Bramall Lane, Sheffield. He scored 25 runs in his three matches, at an average of 5.00 and a high score of 8. With the ball, he took 2 wickets at a bowling average of 55.50, with best figures of 1/25. He later stood as an umpire in two first-class matches in 1874, between the Gentlemen of the South and the Players of the North, and the Gentlemen against the Players. He also stood in six Minor Counties Championship matches between 1898 and 1902.

He died at Tonbridge, Kent, on 24 February 1933.

References

External links
Alfred Luff at ESPNcricinfo
Alfred Luff at CricketArchive

1846 births
1933 deaths
People from Kew, London
English cricketers
Surrey cricketers
English cricket umpires